Whangārei (formerly Whangarei) is a New Zealand parliamentary electorate that was first created for the . In the  Reti narrowly lost the seat to Labour's Emily Henderson.

Population centres
There were 84 electorates for the 1969 election, and the 1972 electoral redistribution saw three additional general seats created for the North Island, bringing the total number of electorates to 87. Together with increased urbanisation in Christchurch and Nelson, the changes proved very disruptive to existing electorates. In the South Island, three electorates were abolished, and three electorates were newly created. In the North Island, five electorates were abolished, two electorates were recreated, and six electorates were newly created (including Whangārei).

Redistributions in 2002, 2007, and 2013/14 did not change the boundaries further. Changes announced in April 2020 will move Poroti and Maungakaramea into the Northland electorate and also change the electorate's name from Whangarei to Whangārei.

The electorate includes the following population centres:
 Whangārei
 Hikurangi
 Ruakaka
It extends from Hikurangi in the north to Ruatangata and Maungatapere in the west and Waipu and Langs Beach in the south.

History
It was won by the Labour Party in that election, but was then held by the National Party until 2020. Phil Heatley held it from  until he retired in 2014.

Members of Parliament
Unless otherwise stated, all MPs terms began and ended at a general election.

Key

List MPs
Members of Parliament elected from party lists in elections where that person also unsuccessfully contested the Whangārei electorate. Unless otherwise stated, all MPs terms began and ended at general elections.

1Donnelly resigned in February 2008 when appointed High Commissioner to the Cook Islands

Election results

2020 election

2017 election

2014 election

2011 election

Electorate (as at 26 November 2011): 46,511

2008 election

2005 election

2002 election

1999 election
Refer to Candidates in the New Zealand general election 1999 by electorate#Whangarei for a list of candidates.

1993 election

1990 election

1987 election

1984 election

1981 election

1978 election

1975 election

1972 election

Notes

References

External links
 Whangarei Electorate Profile, Parliamentary Library

New Zealand electorates
1972 establishments in New Zealand